Champ C. Seibold (December 5, 1911 – November 1971) was a professional American football player who played offensive lineman for seven seasons for the Chicago Cardinals and Green Bay Packers.

References
http://www.nfl.com/player/champseibold/2525291/profile

related to Quinn Esslinger

1911 births
1971 deaths
American football offensive tackles
American football offensive guards
Chicago Cardinals players
Green Bay Packers players
Wisconsin Badgers football players
Ripon Red Hawks football players
Players of American football from Wisconsin
Sportspeople from Oshkosh, Wisconsin